Aiguille du Belvédère is a mountain of Haute-Savoie, France.

Lying to the northwest of Chamonix, Aiguille du Belvedere is a popular climb as its position high above the Chamonix valley provides it with fantastic views of the Mont Blanc massif to its east and the Bernese Alps to its north. Lac Blanc lies on its eastern slopes.

References

Mountains of Haute-Savoie
Mountains of the Alps